Fazhanhe Hani Ethnic Township is an ethnic township in Lancang Lahu Autonomous County, Yunnan, China.

Etymology
The township named after Fazhan River, which flows through the region.

Administrative division
As of 2016, the township is divided into four villages: 
Fazhanhe 
Mengnai 
Heishan 
Yingpan

History
Formerly known as "Yingpan District", it came under the jurisdiction of Dayakou Tudusi in the Qing dynasty (1644–1911).

In 1940, it belonged to the 3rd District and then became Xinya Township.

In 1949, it was under the jurisdiction of Ningjiang County. After Ningjiang County was revoked in 1953, it was renamed "Yingpan District". In 1971 its name was changed to "Yingpan Commune". It was formed as a township in 1988.

Geography
The township is situated at southeastern Lancang Lahu Autonomous County. It borders Nuozhadu Town in the north and northeast, Town in the east, Menghai County in the south and east, Huimin Town in the southwest, and Jiujing Hani Ethnic Township in the west.

There are over five rivers and streams in the township, such as Fazhan River, Mengsong River, Manghong River, Nankang River, and Mengnai River.

Economy
The economy of the township is mainly based on agriculture, including farming and pig-breeding. Tea, sugarcane, and fruit are the economic plants of this region.

Demographics

As of 2017, the National Bureau of Statistics of China estimates the township's population now to be 15,884.

Transportation
The National Highway G214 passes across the township north to south.

References

Bibliography

Townships of Pu'er City
Divisions of Lancang Lahu Autonomous County